Athenion of Maroneia (Ancient Greek: Ἀθηνίων Μαρωνίτης) was an ancient Greek painter, born at Maroneia in Thrace who flourished during the late 4th and early 3rd centuries BC. He was a pupil of Glaucion of Corinth, and a contemporary probably of Nicias, whom he resembled and excelled, though his style was harsher. He gave promise of the highest excellence in his art, but died young.

Works
Αχιλλεύς ως κόρη (Achilles, disguised as a Girl, discovered by Odysseus)
Συγγενικόν (An Assembly of Relatives)
Νεανίας Iπποκόμος (Α Groom with a Horse)
Φύλαρχος (Phylarch)

References
Natural History (Pliny) : xxxv.134
Art Encyclopedia
Dictionary of Greek and Roman Biography and Mythology : Athenion.7

Sources

Ancient Greek painters
Ancient Thracian Greeks
4th-century BC Greek people
3rd-century BC Greek people
People from Maroneia